is a railway station in Shibuya, Tokyo, Japan, operated by the East Japan Railway Company (JR East) and the Tokyo Metropolitan Bureau of Transportation (Toei). It is station E-26 under Toei's numbering system.

Station layout

JR East
The JR East station consists of two ground-level side platforms on either side of an island platform, serving four tracks in total. 

Chest-high platform edge doors were installed on the Yamanote Line platforms in September 2015, and brought into use from October.

There are three exits: East exit, West exit, and North exit. The latter two provide easy access to the Oedo line.

Toei
The Toei Oedo Line station has one underground island platform serving two tracks.

History
The station first opened on 23 October 1906 by a private company as a station on the Chūō Main Line, but was nationalized only a week later when the Japanese National Railways (JNR) took over the company and all of its assessments. The underground Toei Ōedo Line station opened on 20 April 2000.

Station numbering was introduced to the JR East platforms in 2016 with Yoyogi being assigned station numbers JB11 for the Chūō-Sobu line, and JY18 for the Yamanote line.

Passenger statistics
In fiscal 2013, the JR East station was used by an average of 70,016 passengers daily (boarding passengers only), making it the 63rd-busiest station operated by JR East. In fiscal 2013, the Toei station was used by an average of 17,382 passengers daily (boarding passengers only). The daily average passenger figures (boarding passengers only) for JR East in previous years are as shown below.

See also

 List of railway stations in Japan
 Transportation in Greater Tokyo

References

External links

 JR East station information 
 Toei station information 

Yamanote Line
Chūō-Sōbu Line
Toei Ōedo Line
Stations of East Japan Railway Company
Stations of Tokyo Metropolitan Bureau of Transportation
Railway stations in Tokyo
Buildings and structures in Shibuya
Railway stations in Japan opened in 1906